Admiral Sir Charles James Colebrooke Little  (14 June 1882 – 20 June 1973) was a senior Royal Navy officer who went on to be Second Sea Lord and Chief of Naval Personnel.

Naval career
Little joined the Royal Navy at the training ship Britannia in 1897. He served in World War I and commanded the cruiser HMS Fearless and the Grand Fleet Submarine Flotilla from 1916 to 1918.

After the War he commanded the cruiser HMS Cleopatra in the Baltic Sea and then, in 1920, became Director of the Trade Division at the Admiralty. He was appointed Captain of the Fleet for the Mediterranean Station in 1922 and then became a Senior Staff Officer at the Royal Naval War College in 1924. He became Captain of the battleship HMS Iron Duke in 1926 and Director of the Royal Naval Staff College in 1927. He became Commander of the 2nd Battle Squadron in 1930 and Rear Admiral Submarines in 1931. He was appointed Deputy Chief of the Naval Staff in 1932 and Commander-in-Chief of the China Station in 1936. In 1938 he became Second Sea Lord and Chief of Naval Personnel. In this capacity he was instrumental in establishing the Admiralty Torpedo, Mining and Electrical Training Establishment at Roedean School in Brighton.

He served in World War II becoming Head of British Joint Staff Mission to Washington D. C. in 1941 and Commander-in-Chief, Portsmouth in 1942. He retired in 1945.

He lived at Thakeham in West Sussex.

References

|-

|-

|-

|-

1882 births
1973 deaths
Knights Grand Cross of the Order of the Bath
Knights Grand Cross of the Order of the British Empire
Royal Navy admirals of World War II
Lords of the Admiralty
Admiralty personnel of World War II
People from Thakeham